Nissan Stadium is a multi-purpose stadium in Nashville, Tennessee, United States. Owned by the Metropolitan Government of Nashville and Davidson County, it is primarily used for football and is the home field of the Tennessee Titans of the National Football League (NFL) and the Tigers of Tennessee State University. The stadium is the site of the TransPerfect Music City Bowl, a postseason college football bowl game played each December, and from 2020 until 2021 the home field of Nashville SC of Major League Soccer (MLS). Nissan Stadium is used for concerts such as those affiliated with the CMA Music Festival each June. The stadium also has facilities to host public events, meetings, and parties.

Nissan Stadium is located on the east bank of the Cumberland River, across the river from downtown Nashville and has a seating capacity of 69,143. Its first regular-season game was a 36–35 win over the Cincinnati Bengals on September 12, 1999. Nissan Stadium has been known by Adelphia Coliseum (1999–2002), the Coliseum (2002–2006), and LP Field (2006–2015).

The stadium features three levels of seating. The lower bowl encompasses the field and the club and upper levels form the stadium's dual towers, rising above the lower bowl along each sideline. The stadium's luxury suites are located within the towers. Three levels of suites are located in the stadium's eastern tower, one between the lower and club levels, and two between the club and upper levels. The western tower has two levels of suites between the club and upper levels. The press box is located between the lower and club levels in the western tower. Nissan Stadium's dual video boards are behind the lower bowl in each end zone.

As of the 2023 season, the playing surface of Nissan Stadium is Matrix Helix Turf with an organic infill. Prior to 2023, the playing surface was Tifsport Bermuda Sod, a natural grass. The climate of Nashville and the wear of hosting a game nearly every weekend often required the field to be resodded in the area between the hashes in November, and the stadium had amongst the highest lower body injuries of any in the NFL during the 2018-2021 seasons.

On Nissan Stadium's eastern side is the Titans Pro Shop, a retail store that sells team merchandise.

With Tennessee State being tenants, Nissan Stadium is the largest stadium in the Football Championship Subdivision (FCS and formerly known as I-AA).

History

During the 1995 NFL Preseason, the Houston Oilers faced the Washington Redskins in an exhibition game at Neyland Stadium in Knoxville, Tennessee. At the game, Oilers owner Bud Adams met Nashville Mayor Phil Bredesen and began discussing the possibility of moving the team to Middle Tennessee due to Adams' discontent with the team's lease at the Astrodome and unwillingness of the City of Houston to build a new football-only stadium. Later that year, Adams and Bredesen announced the team's intent to move to Nashville. The city and team decided to locate a stadium on the eastern bank of the Cumberland River across from downtown Nashville, in what had been a declining industrial/warehousing area.

In a special referendum on May 7, 1996, voters in Metropolitan Nashville/Davidson County voted to approve partial funding of the proposed stadium. The vote, which allocated $144 million of public money to the project, passed with a 59 percent majority. The pro-stadium organization, known as "NFL Yes!", outspent the anti-stadium group by a ratio of 16:1 during the campaign.

The funds would initially be raised through an increase in the Metro water tax. Much of the remaining construction costs were funded through the sale of personal seat licenses. Some money from the State of Tennessee was allocated to the project, on the condition that the Tennessee State University football team move its home games there, and with the request that the incoming NFL team be named Tennessee instead of Nashville.

The stadium's construction was delayed when the construction site was hit by a tornado that struck downtown Nashville on April 16, 1998, and destroyed several cranes, but the stadium opened in time for the first scheduled event.

The flood also reached down to the locker rooms of the stadium.

The stadium received upgrades during mid-2012. Among the improvements are a new sound system, high-speed elevators to the upper levels, and LED ribbon boards mounted on the faces of the upper mezzanines. At the time of installation, the two boards became the second-largest displays in the National Football League (trailing only AT&T Stadium).

In 2014 and 2015, the stadium hosted the Nashville Kickoff Game, a college football game featuring major NCAA teams for Tennessee.

During the 2018 season, two 20th anniversary logos were put in each of the end zones to help celebrate the Titans' 20th year in Nashville. The yard line numbers were also changed to match the number style on the new uniforms.

In 2020, IndyCar announced the creation of the Music City Grand Prix. It will be carried out in Downtown Nashville and around Nissan Stadium, and it will use the facilities for Club seats in August 2021.

The stadium was the site of the 2022 NHL Stadium Series between the Nashville Predators and the Tampa Bay Lightning.

In February 2022, the Titans paused ongoing renovations to the stadium, citing the rising costs and the antiquated structure, to explore the possibility of replacing the facility in the near future. They would later commit to a full replacement in late 2022, releasing renderings for their new stadium, which will possibly open in 2026.

Naming rights

During its construction, the stadium had no official name, though it was generally referred to as "The East Bank Stadium", a reference to the stadium's location on the eastern bank of the Cumberland River. Upon its completion, it was given the name "Adelphia Coliseum" in a 15-year, $30 million naming rights arrangement with Adelphia Business Solutions, a subsidiary of the larger Adelphia telecommunications company. However, after Adelphia missed a required payment and subsequently filed for bankruptcy in 2002, the agreement was abandoned and the stadium became known simply as "The Coliseum" for four years. (Adelphia itself was dissolved in 2006.)

A naming rights deal with Nashville-based Louisiana-Pacific was inked on June 6, 2006. Louisiana-Pacific, which markets itself as "LP Building Products", paid $30 million over 10 years for naming rights. LP's influence inside the stadium led to the creation of the LP Building Zones in 2007, located beneath the giant scoreboards from Daktronics at the north and south ends of the stadium. The concession stands and restrooms in these two areas were decorated to look like suburban homes using LP products.

On June 24, 2015, car manufacturer Nissan, which has its North American headquarters just south of Nashville in Franklin and operates a large manufacturing plant in nearby Smyrna, and headquartered in Nishi-ku, Yokohama, Japan, bought the naming rights for the stadium in a 20-year contract, rebranding the stadium as Nissan Stadium. As part of the sponsor agreement, a 2016 Nissan Titan pickup truck was placed next to the stadium scoreboard.

Tennessee Titans

The Tennessee Titans have posted an impressive record at Nissan Stadium since moving there in 1999, including winning their first 13 games before losing to the Baltimore Ravens on November 12, 2000. Overall in a total of 181 games, the Titans are 100–76 in the regular season  and 2–3 in playoffs at Nissan Stadium. Since moving to Nissan Stadium, the Titans have made the playoffs nine times, played in three AFC Championship Games, and appeared in one Super Bowl (XXXIV).

Music City Miracle

On January 8, 2000, one of the most memorable and debated plays in NFL history took place at then-Adelphia Coliseum. The "Music City Miracle" (as it has come to be known) was a last-minute trick play on a kickoff return that resulted in a touchdown and catapulted the Titans past the Buffalo Bills to the Divisional Playoffs. It also ensured that the Titans would go undefeated in the first season in the team's new home. The victory was seen in front of a franchise-record crowd.

Soccer
Nissan Stadium regularly hosts soccer matches featuring the United States men's national team as well as by the women's national team and visiting professional clubs. The venue was first used for soccer on April 20, 2004, in an exhibition game between the Los Angeles Galaxy of Major League Soccer and Tecos UAG of the Mexican Primera División. Since then Nissan Stadium has been used for friendly matches by the U.S. women versus Canada in 2004, a return of Tecos against rival F.C. Atlas in 2005, and the U.S. men versus Morocco in 2006. The stadium helped host the CONCACAF men's 2008 and 2012 qualifying tournaments for the 2008 and 2012 Summer Olympics.

On April 1, 2009, the U.S. men's national team played a World Cup qualifier beating Trinidad and Tobago, 3–0.  The match saw Jozy Altidore become the youngest American to score a hat trick for the national team. The U.S. men returned March 29, 2011 falling to Paraguay in a friendly before a record crowd of 29,059 – the largest to attend a soccer game in the state of Tennessee.

Nissan Stadium was chosen for two games of the Group Stage for the 2017 CONCACAF Gold Cup.

The record crowd for a soccer game played in Tennessee is 56,232 and was set on July 29, 2017, when English Premier League clubs Manchester City and Tottenham played an exhibition match at Nissan Stadium.

Major League Soccer club Nashville SC began playing at the stadium in February 2020, and played their final game there in 2021.

Concerts and events
Nissan Stadium can also serve as a large concert venue. The main stage for the annual CMA Music Festival, held every June, is located in the stadium.

Professional wrestling

The arena has also hosted the WWE event SummerSlam on July 30, 2022. The event had an attendence of 48,449.

See also
 List of current National Football League stadiums
 List of NCAA Division I FCS football stadiums

References

External links

Nissan Stadium – Tennessee Titans

National Football League venues
Major League Soccer stadiums
Nissan
College football venues
Music City Bowl
NCAA bowl game venues
Tennessee State Tigers football
Tennessee Titans stadiums
Sports venues in Nashville, Tennessee
American football venues in Tennessee
Soccer venues in Tennessee
Sports venues completed in 1999
CONCACAF Gold Cup stadiums
1999 establishments in Tennessee
Nashville SC